Robert Labritz (born May 31, 1971) is an American professional golfer who currently plays on the PGA Tour Champions.

Labritz was the only club professional to make the cut for the 2010 PGA Championship at the Straits Course of the Whistling Straits complex in Haven, Wisconsin. He tied for 68th (along with Stuart Appleby).

He also played in the 2002, 2003, 2013, 2016, and 2019 PGA Championships. He was one of three PGA Professionals to make the cut in 2019 and finished T60, earning the Crystal Ball as the low PGA Professional.

Labritz won the 2006 New York State PGA Championship and three New York State Opens. Labritz plays out of the Metropolitan section of the PGA of America.

Labritz has three children.  He has worked at GlenArbor Golf Club in Bedford Hills, New York, for many years.

In 2021, Labritz qualified for PGA Tour Champions after being the medalist at the tour's qualifying school.

Professional wins
2006 New York State PGA Championship
2008 New York State Open
2011 New York State Open
2016 New York State Open, Westchester Open
2019 Rhode Island Open
2021 Massachusetts Open

Results in major championships
Results not in chronological order in 2020.

CUT = missed the half-way cut
"T" = tied
NT = No tournament due to COVID-19 pandemic

U.S. national team appearances
PGA Cup: 2003 (winners)

References

American male golfers
1971 births
Living people